Parental Guidance may refer to:

 Parental Guidance (film), a 2012 comedy film starring Billy Crystal, Bette Midler, Marisa Tomei, Bailee Madison and Tom Everett Scott
 "Parental Guidance" (song), 1980s song by the heavy metal band Judas Priest
 Parental Guidance (TV series), a Singaporean drama
 Parental Guidance (Edmond Leung album), 2000
 PG rating (disambiguation), media content ratings